MedStar Harbor Hospital is a private nonprofit, 150-bed, acute care teaching hospital in Baltimore City, Maryland, U.S. It is located on South Hanover Street along the Middle Branch of the Patapsco River in the Cherry Hill neighborhood of South Baltimore. The hospital has around 10,000 inpatients admissions and close to 60,000 emergency department visits per year. Its areas of specialty include orthopaedics, oncology, women's services, cardiology, internal medicine and neurosurgery. Harbor Hospital also offers a medical residency program in internal medicine and a transitional program that prepares residents to specialize in other areas.

History
Originally named South Baltimore Eye, Ear, Nose and Throat Hospital, the hospital was established by physician Harry Peterman in 1903. It was located on Light Street in what was then an industrial area of Baltimore City. When the hospital outgrew its original location, it purchased  from Broening Park, formerly the site of the Maryland Yacht Club. Construction of the present MedStar Harbor Hospital began in 1967 and was completed in 1968. The present location's proximity to the Inner Harbor inspired the name, Harbor Hospital.

In 1996, Harbor Hospital became part of Helix Health, a regional health care network. Helix merged with Medlantic Healthcare Group in 1998 and in 1999 was renamed MedStar Health.

Services offered
Harbor Hospital offers the following services:

 Arthritis & Osteoporosis Center
 Cancer Center—The Cancer Center recently received a full three-year accreditation from the Commission on Cancer (CoC) of the American College of Surgeons.
 Cardiology
 Diabetes
 Emergency department
 Gastroenterology/hepatology
 Lung Cancer Center
 Neonatal Care Unit
 Neurosurgical care
 Orthopaedics
 Pediatrics
 Rehabilitation services
 Pulmonary rehabilitation
 Sleep Center
 Stroke—MedStar Harbor Hospital is certified as a primary stroke center by the Joint Commission.
 Obstetrics and gynecology services

Accreditation and recognition
MedStar Harbor Hospital is accredited by the Joint Commission, an independent, nonprofit organization that evaluates and accredits health care programs in the United States.

Harbor Hospital has been awarded the Delmarva Foundation Quality Excellence Award, an independent, nonprofit organization dedicated to health care quality improvement. It has earned the award eight times, (2001, 2006, 2007, 2008, 2010, 2011, 2012 and 2013) more than any other hospital in the Delmarva area, including Maryland, Washington D.C., and Delaware.

References

External links
 
 Google Street View

Cherry Hill, Baltimore
Hospital buildings completed in 1968
Teaching hospitals in Maryland
Hospitals in Baltimore